Bill Charleson (5 July 1929 – 17 September 1983) was  a former Australian rules footballer who played with Fitzroy in the Victorian Football League (VFL).

Notes

External links 

1929 births
1983 deaths
Australian rules footballers from Victoria (Australia)
Fitzroy Football Club players